Lucie Dadat (1908-1991) was a French enamellist active in Limoges.

Dadat studied at the École Nationale des Arts Décoratifs de Limoges, now the École nationale supérieure d'art de Limoges.  She joined the workshop of ceramicist Camille Fauré (1874-1956) in 1928 when the boutique was at 31, rue des Tanneries in Limoges.

Notes

References

Sources 
 Michel C. Kiener:  "Les emaux art deco de l'atélier Fauré", Editions Culture et Patrimoine en Limousin, 2016.
 Michel C. Kiener:  "Limoges en Art déco, Les vases de cuivre émaillé de l’atelier Fauré", pp. 146 - 155.
 Alberto Shayo: "Camille Fauré: Limoges Art Deco Enamels: the Geometry of Joy", Antique Collectors' Club, 2007, pp. 28 & 29.

External links
 Les instants essentiels, 2016: La technique de l’émail en relief
 Authenticité: L'Art Déco vu par Camille Fauré
 Le populaire du centre, 2020:  Carte blanche: les émailleuses de Limoges

1908 births
1991 deaths
People from Limoges
French artists
French women artists
Limoges enamel
20th-century French women